"Triple Trouble" is a song by the American hip hop group Beastie Boys, released as the second single from their sixth studio album To the 5 Boroughs. It heavily samples "Rapper's Delight" by the Sugarhill Gang, and interpolates lyrics from "Double Trouble at the Amphitheatre" by Double Trouble.

The music video for "Triple Trouble" was directed by MCA, under his alias Nathaniel Hornblower and filmed in Toronto. Kanye West and John Legend made cameos at the end of the video.

The song was used to promote the third season of the HBO series Bored to Death.

Track listing
"Triple Trouble" (Album version) – 2:46
"Triple Trouble" (J Wizzle Remix) – 3:12
"Triple Trouble" (Graham Coxon Remix) – 3:59 (UK CD release)

Chart positions

References

External links

2004 singles
Beastie Boys songs
2004 songs
EMI Records singles
Songs written by Ad-Rock
Songs written by Mike D
Songs written by Adam Yauch
Songs written by Bernard Edwards
Songs written by Nile Rodgers